Les Owen (11 April 1933 - 7 June 2020) was a Welsh footballer, who played as a full back in the Football League for Chester.

References

Chester City F.C. players
Association football fullbacks
English Football League players
2020 deaths
1933 births
People from Hawarden
Sportspeople from Flintshire
Welsh footballers